George Ciorceri (born 3 September 1955) is a former Romanian professional footballer, currently a manager. George Ciorceri spent over 20 years in Târgu Mureș as a footballer and later as a manager of ASA 1962 Târgu Mureș and ASA 2013 Târgu Mureș. As a player, he had 170 caps for ASA 1962 Târgu Mureș in Divizia A.

References

External links
 

1955 births
Living people
Romanian footballers
ASA Târgu Mureș (1962) players
FC Politehnica Timișoara managers
CFR Cluj managers
FC Brașov (1936) managers
CSM Unirea Alba Iulia managers
ASA 2013 Târgu Mureș managers
Liga I players
Association football midfielders
Romanian football managers
People from Bistrița-Năsăud County